The white-eyed crocodile skink (Tribolonotus novaeguineae) is a species of insectivorous lizard in the family Scincidae. The species is found in
Irian Jaya and Papua New Guinea.

References

Tribolonotus
Reptiles of Papua New Guinea
Reptiles of Indonesia
Reptiles described in 1834
Taxa named by Hermann Schlegel
Skinks of New Guinea